The National Bureau of Statistics is a deputy-cabinet level agency directly under the State Council of China. Established in August 1952, the bureau is responsible for collection, investigation, research and publication of statistics concerning the nation's economy, population and other aspects of the society.

Ning Jizhe serves as the commissioner of the bureau since 2016.

Responsibilities 
The bureau's authority and responsibilities are defined in Statistics Law of the People's Republic of China. It is responsible for the research of the nation's overall statistics and oversee the operations of its local counterparts.

Organizations 
The bureau is led by a commissioner, with several deputy commissioners (currently four), a chief methodologist, a chief economist, and a chief information officer. It is composed of 18 departments, oversees 12 affiliated institutions and manages 32 survey organizations stationed in respective provinces. It also operates China Statistics Press, which was founded in 1955.

The national bureau has 535 employees as authorized by the State Council.

Commissioner 
The current commissioner is Ning Jizhe, who assumed office in February 2016.
Xue Muqiao (August 1952 – November 1958)
Jia Qiyun (November 1958 – June 1961)
Wang Sihua (June 1961 – December 1969)
Chen Xian (September 1974 – October 1981)
Li Chengrui (October 1981 – May 1984)
Zhang Sai (May 1984 – February 1997)
Liu Hong (February 1997 – June 2000)
Zhu Zhixin (June 2000 – March 2003)
Li Deshui (March 2003 – March 2006)
Qiu Xiaohua (March 2006 – October 2006)
Xie Fuzhan (October 2006 – September 2008)
Ma Jiantang (September 2008 – April 2015)
Wang Bao'an (April 2015 – January 2016)
Ning Jizhe (February 2016 – present)

Access 
Its Statistical Communiqué on the National Economic and Social Development and the China Statistical Yearbook are the bureau's most notable publications. It also runs and publishes the national census of economy, population and agriculture.

Internet 
National Data (National Statistical Data Repository) is operated by the bureau, which have both Chinese and English interfaces. All publishable statistical results by the bureau are released on this website, includes monthly, quarterly, and annual data of price indices, industrial data etc.

Since December 2018, the agency began to release detailed dataset to authorized researchers and universities, which uses an application-based system for researchers resides within China. This includes dataset from the 3rd economic census, 6th population census, 3rd agricultural census, sampled 1% population survey of 2015, residents income survey and financials survey on industrial enterprises above designated size.

Archive 
The bureau also operates an archive filled with almanacs ever published by the bureau since 1982, some of the files are not digitalized, hence only accessible through the archive. Citizens can access the archive with their national identification card.

See also 
 Census in China
 China microcensus
 Economic statistics

References

External links 
  (English)
  (Chinese)
 National Data, open national data repository of China.
The Status Quo And Issues Of R&D Statistics In China

Government agencies of China
China
State Council of the People's Republic of China